Sarda chiliensis, the eastern Pacific bonito, is a marine species of bonito. It ranges from Ecuador to Chile. Sarda lineolata, which ranges from Alaska to Mexico was formerly considered a subspecies, as Sarda chiliensis lineolata, but this treatment renders the species geographically disjunct.

References

Scombridae
Fish described in 1832
Taxa named by Georges Cuvier